Death Over My Shoulder   is a 1958 British crime film directed by Arthur Crabtree based on a story by American journalist Alyce Canfield. The film stars Keefe Brasselle and his wife Arlene DeMarco one of The DeMarco Sisters.

Plot
When Jack Regan is unable to meet his payments for his ill son, he hires a professional killer to do him in so his son will receive Jack's insurance money.

Cast
Keefe Brasselle ... 	Jack Regan
Bonar Colleano ... 	Joe Longo
Jill Adams 	... Evelyn Connors
Arlene DeMarco ... 	Julie
Charles Farrell ... 	Shiv Maitland
Al Mulock 	... 	Brainy Peterson
Sonia Dresdel ... 	Miss Upton

References

External links

1958 films
1958 crime drama films
British crime drama films
Films directed by Arthur Crabtree
Films scored by Douglas Gamley
1960s English-language films
1950s English-language films
1950s British films